The 400 metres, or 400-meter dash, is a sprint event in track and field competitions. It has been featured in the athletics programme at the Summer Olympics since 1896 for men and since 1964 for women. On a standard outdoor running track, it is one lap around the track. Runners start in staggered positions and race in separate lanes for the entire course. In many countries, athletes previously competed in the 440-yard dash (402.336 m)—which is a quarter of a mile and was referred to as the 'quarter-mile'—instead of the 400 m (437.445 yards), though this distance is now obsolete.

Like other sprint disciplines, the 400 m involves the use of starting blocks. The runners take up position in the blocks on the 'ready' command, adopt a more efficient starting posture which isometrically preloads their muscles on the 'set' command, and stride forwards from the blocks upon hearing the starter's pistol. The blocks allow the runners to begin more powerfully and thereby contribute to their overall sprint speed capability. Maximum sprint speed capability is a significant contributing factor to success in the event, but athletes also require substantial speed endurance and the ability to cope well with high amounts of lactic acid to sustain a fast speed over a whole lap. While considered to be predominantly an anaerobic event, there is some aerobic involvement and the degree of aerobic training required for 400-metre athletes is open to debate.

The current men's world record is held by Wayde van Niekerk of South Africa, with a time of 43.03 seconds. Van Niekerk is also the Olympic record holder. Steven Gardiner is the reigning Olympic Champion. Michael Norman is the current world champion and the world indoor record holder with a time of 44.52 seconds. The current women's world record is held by Marita Koch, with a time of 47.60 seconds. Shaunae Miller-Uibo is the reigning women's Olympic champion and world champion. Femke Bol holds the world indoor record at 49.26 (2023). The men's T43 Paralympic world record of 45.07 seconds is held by Oscar Pistorius.

An Olympic double of 200 metres and 400 m was first achieved by Valerie Brisco-Hooks in 1984, and later by Marie-José Pérec of France and Michael Johnson from the United States on the same evening in 1996. Alberto Juantorena of Cuba at the 1976 Summer Olympics became the first and so far the only athlete to win both the 400 m and 800 m Olympic titles. Pérec became the first to defend the Olympic title in 1996, Johnson became the first and only man to do so in 2000. From 31 appearances in the Olympic Games, the men's gold medalist came from the US 19 times.

Continental records
Updated 22 December 2020.

All-time top 25

Men (outdoor)

Correct as of June 2022.

Women (outdoor)

Correct as of September 2022.

Annulled marks
Christine Mboma ran 48.54 in Bydgoszcz on 30 June 2021, but her performance was removed from the World Athletics database because of Testosterone regulations in women's athletics.
Aminatou Seyni ran 49.19 in Lausanne on 5 July 2019, but her performance was removed from the World Athletics database because of Testosterone regulations in women's athletics.
Yuliya Gushchina ran 49.28 in Cheboksary on 5 July 2012, but her time was annulled after she tested positive for turinabol—a banned steroid—in a 2016 retest of a sample taken from the 2011 World Championships.

Men (indoor)
Correct as of March 2023.

Notes
Below is a list of other times equal or superior to 45.08:
Michael Johnson also ran 44.66 (1996) and 44.97 (1995).
Randolph Ross also ran 44.83 (2022), 44.99 (2021).
Michael Norman also ran 45.00 (2018).
Fred Kerley also ran 45.02 (2017), 45.03 (2021).
Akeem Bloomfield also ran 45.02 (2018).
Kahmari Montgomery also ran 45.04 (2019).

Women (indoor)
Correct as of March 2023.

Notes
Below is a list of other times equal or superior to 50.46:
Jarmila Kratochvílová also ran 49.64 (1981) and 49.69 (1983).
Femke Bol also ran 49.85 (2023), 49.96 (2023), 50.20 (2023) and 50.30 (2022).
Taťána Kocembová also ran 49.97 (1984).
Natalya Nazarova also ran 49.98 (2006).
Olesya Krasnomovets also ran 50.04 (12 March 2006).
Rhasidat Adeleke also ran 50.45 (4 February 2023, 11 March 2023).

Fastest relay splits

Men

Women

Most successful athletes
3 or more 400-metre victories at the Olympic Games and World Championships:

6 wins: Michael Johnson (USA) - Olympic Champion in 1996 and 2000, World Champion in 1993, 1995, 1997 and 1999.
4 wins: Marie-Jose Perec (FRA) - Olympic Champion in 1992 and 1996, World Champion in 1991 and 1995.
3 wins: Cathy Freeman (AUS) - Olympic Champion in 2000, World Champion in 1997 and 1999.
3 wins: Jeremy Wariner (USA) - Olympic Champion in 2004, World Champion in 2005 and 2007.
3 wins: Christine Ohuruogu (GBR) - Olympic Champion in 2008, World Champion in 2007 and 2013.
3 wins: LaShawn Merritt (USA) - Olympic Champion in 2008, World Champion in 2009 and 2013.
3 wins: Wayde van Niekerk (RSA) - Olympic Champion in 2016, World Champion in 2015 and 2017.
3 wins: Shaunae Miller-Uibo (BAH) - Olympic Champion in 2016 and 2020, World Champion in 2022.

The Olympic champion has frequently won a second gold medal in the 4 × 400 metres relay. This has been accomplished 14 times by men; Charles Reidpath, Ray Barbuti, Bill Carr, George Rhoden, Charles Jenkins, Otis Davis, Mike Larrabee, Lee Evans, Viktor Markin, Alonzo Babers, Steve Lewis, Quincy Watts, Jeremy Wariner and LaShawn Merritt; and 4 times by women; Monika Zehrt, Valerie Brisco-Hooks, Olga Bryzgina and Sanya Richards-Ross. All but Rhoden, Markin, Zehrt and Bryzgina ran on American relay teams. Injured after his double in 1996, Johnson also accomplished the feat in 2000 only to have it disqualified when his teammate Antonio Pettigrew admitted to doping.

Olympic medalists

Men

Women

World Championships medalists

Men

Women

World Indoor Championships medalists

Men

Women

 Known as the World Indoor Games

Season's bests

Men

Women

Notes and references

External links

IAAF list of 400-metres records in XML
All-time Masters men's 400 m list
All-time Masters women's 400 m list

 
Events in track and field
Sprint (running)
Summer Olympic disciplines in athletics